Great Southern Spirits is a composition by Australian composer Stephen Leek.  It is in four movements: Wirindji, Mulga, Kondalilla and Uluru.  It was first recorded by The Australian Voices, under the direction of Graeme Morton, on their album of the same name in 1993.

Chamber music compositions